Charles Vandeweghe (born 14 October 1982 in Ghent, East Flanders) is a field hockey forward from Belgium, who was a member of the Men's National Team that missed qualification for the 2004 Summer Olympics in Athens.

Belgium finished in 8th place at the Olympic Qualifier Tournament in Madrid, in March 2004, after losing on penalty strokes against South Africa. Vandeweghe plays for a club in his native country called Waterloo Ducks. He competed at the 2008 Summer Olympics for his native country. His brother Loic Vandeweghe was on the same team.

References
 Tophockey Belgium

External links
 
 

1982 births
Living people
Belgian male field hockey players
Male field hockey forwards
2002 Men's Hockey World Cup players
Field hockey players at the 2008 Summer Olympics
Olympic field hockey players of Belgium
Sportspeople from Ghent
Waterloo Ducks H.C. players
Men's Belgian Hockey League players